The New York Police and Fire Widows' and Children's Benefit Fund is a non-profit organization dedicated to supporting the families of New York City's first responders who have been killed in the line of duty. Through lifelong financial assistance, special gatherings, and a network of support, the fund has reassured that the sacrifice made by their loved ones is never forgotten.

History

Creation of the fund 
The Fund was created in 1985, by former New York Mets player Rusty Staub and J. Patrick "Paddy" Burns, then-Vice President of the New York Patrolmen's Benevolent Association. Staub was inspired to create the fund after reading a news story about a New York City Police officer killed the line of duty. When Rusty was a boy, his uncle Marvin Morton was also killed in the line of duty as a New Orleans police officer, leaving behind a wife and young children. Speaking about the loss, Staub remembered "How difficult it was for my uncle's family, I remember saying the rosary on the bed with my mom. That was the first time I saw her cry." Staub determined to help this officer's family, and other families who had lost a loved one in answering the call.

In its initial years, the organization hosted an annual gala, where widows and donors came together to support one another and raise funds for the cause. In addition, families would enjoy for a picnic at Shea Stadium, where children would throw out the first pitch and beneficiaries connected with the approximately six to eight new families who had lost a loved one that year. Prior to September 11, 2001, the fund had raised $13 million in its then-16 year history, supporting approximately 500 families.

September 11th Terrorist Attacks 
The terrorist attacks on the World Trade Center resulted in the loss of 2,606 lives, including 343 firefighters and 71 law enforcement officers. At the time, families received a $10,000 death benefit from the charity. Three hundred and fifty families first-responder families now represented an immediate need for $4 million, but in the weeks that followed, this need was met and exceeded. In the months following the 9/11 Terrorist Attacks, the fund was able to give over $117 million to its beneficiaries.

The Fund continues to support the families of those lost before, during, and after 9/11, providing annual financial assistance to the families of fallen NYPD and FDNY Officers and Firefighters, Emergency Medical Services and Port Authority Police Officers.

Leadership 
The fund is an independent 501(c)(3) charity and does not receive any federal, state or city dollars but relies exclusively on private donations. Board officers include:
 Stephen J. Dannhauser (Chair)
 Philip V. Moyles Jr. (President)
 Lawrence M.v.D. Schloss (Vice Chair)
 Mark Douglas Messier (Vice President, Community Affairs)
John W. Neary (Treasurer)
John R. Nolan (Assistant Treasurer)
Brian A. Waldbaum (Secretary)

The Board of Directors of the NYPFWC Benefit Fund includes Michael J. Aiello, Gergory J. Barbaccia, William J. Begley, Kyle N. Cruz, William F. Dawson Jr., John Q. Doyle, Gerry Flynn, Martin J. Geller, J. Kevin Gilgan, John W. Keogh, Stephen J. Ketchem, Robert Lewin, Dottie Mattison,  Edward J. Munshower, Carrie M. Reilly, Marc Rosenbaum, A. Andrew Shapiro, Edward Skyler, Steven Stuart, Andrew D. Trickett, Howard Weiser, and Peter Zaffino.

Junior Committee 
Individuals from the New York area assist with planning and execution of the annual gala and annual baseball game, as well as raise funds at a summer kickoff event.

Jessy Albaz, Toni Ann Arrigo, Timothy G. Blair, Luke Callinan, Norman Cerullo, Courtney Davis, William F. Dawson III, Kimberly DeForest, Adi Divgi, Patrick Dowdell, Brendan Dunn,  Morgan Frick, James D. Geness, Alexander F. Gershner, Lawrence Guarnieri, Colleen Hurley, Richard J. Hurley, Alex Kaiser, Lauren Koslow, Rony Ma, Reny Mazorra, Jason Moskal, Francesca Nestande, Jessica Nolan, Peter Phillips, Michael Reed, Stefanie Robledo, Warren J. Stella, Allison Sullivan, Christina T.Ton, John P. Umbach, and Tess Wartman.

References

External links 
 

Charities based in New York City
1985 establishments in New York City
Widowhood in the United States
Women in New York City